Elrad may refer to:
 Earth-Limb Radiance Experiment, a secondary payload of the 26th Space Shuttle mission, STS-26
 elrad (magazine), a discontinued semi-professional electronic magazine in Germany
 Long Range Acoustic Device or "LRAD" (pronounced "el-rad")